Mount Barney is a rural locality in the Scenic Rim Region, Queensland, Australia.

The locality borders New South Wales.

Geography 

The locality takes its name from the mountain of the same name which occupies most of the western side of the locality, is part of the Mount Barney National Park and is undeveloped bushland. Farm land lies in a valley of the Logan River in the eastern part of the locality which separates the mountain Mount Barney from Mount Gillies in the very east of the locality. There are crops and grazing in the valley.

History 

The Thulumbah Provisional School opened in 1901 and became Thulumbah State School on 1 January 1909. In 1916 it was renamed Mount Barney State School. The school closed in 1962. It was located on a bend in the Mount Barney Road.

The locality contains 23 households, in which 50.0% of the population are males and 50.0% of the population are females with a median age of 31, 7 years below the national average. The average weekly household income is $0, $1,438 below the national average.

References

External links 

Scenic Rim Region
Localities in Queensland